Brutus is an aero-engined car. It is powered by a water-cooled  BMW V12 aircraft engine, which produces between  @ 1530 rpm, but can produce a maximum of  @ 1700 rpm for shorts bursts of one minute, and is mated to a 1907/1908 American LaFrance chassis.

Background
Brutus made an appearance on the British television program Top Gear on 4 March 2012, during the sixth episode of Season 18. The Brutus was built in Germany shortly after World War II, when a 1908 American LaFrance car was fitted with a  V12 BMW aircraft engine that dates to 1925. The car was created over several years at a workshop at the Auto & Technik Museum in Sinsheim, Germany, which still owns it. According to the Museum, the Brutus can produce  at 1,500 rpm, while its fuel efficiency averages . After driving the car on Top Gear, presenter Jeremy Clarkson described the experience as akin to "doing a crossword while being eaten by a tiger".

References

External links

 Project Car Brutus  Technik Museum Sinsheim  Germany 

Cars powered by aircraft engines